Albert Planasdemunt i Gubert (17 November 1929 – 18 May 2021) was a Spanish politician. A member of the Democratic and Social Centre, he served in the Parliament of Catalonia from 1980 to 1984.

Biography
Planasdemunt studied to be a mechanical technician and began working as an industrialist. In the 1979 Spanish local elections, he became a member of the municipal council of Breda as part of the Centrists of Catalonia.

In 1982, he became President of the Democratic and Social Centre in the Catalan Parliament but successfully ran for Mayor of Breda in 1983 as an independent. He was re-elected in 1987 and rejoined the municipal council in 1991. He retired following the 2011 Spanish local elections but continued as a substitute.

Albert Planasdemunt i Gubert died on 18 May 2021 at the age of 91.

References

1929 births
2021 deaths
Democratic and Social Centre (Spain) politicians
Members of the Parliament of Catalonia
Municipal councillors in the province of Girona
People from Selva